Fariborz Besarati (born 23 August 1966) is a Swedish former wrestler who competed in the 1992 Summer Olympics and in the 1996 Summer Olympics.

References

External links
 

1966 births
Living people
Olympic wrestlers of Sweden
Wrestlers at the 1992 Summer Olympics
Wrestlers at the 1996 Summer Olympics
Swedish male sport wrestlers